Policajti z předměstí (in English Suburb Cops) is a Czech television comedy series which premiered on TV Nova. In 1999, 21 episodes were aired.

Plot 
Stories about a small police station in the Strašnice district of Prague.

Production 
"Policajti z předměstí" was a third TV Nova sitcom after Nováci and Hospoda. A shooting started in 1998, and first episode was aired on February 2, 1999, in a day of fifth anniversary of TV Nova. Because of very bad reviews, a series was cancelled after 21 episodes.

Cast and characters 
 Josef Carda as lieutenant Sluníčko
 Vlastimil Zavřel as ensign Čermák
 Michal Suchánek as Kubele
 Milan Šimáček as Zajíček
 Dagmar Ďásková as sergeant Matušková
 Aleš Háma as sergeant Chroust

List of Episodes 
 1.Velký šéf
 2.Cesty zlata
 3.Pivo pro policii
 4.Anglicky snadno a rychle
 5.V rytmu valčíku
 6.Jak vypadat vážně
 7.Vzorná jednotka
 8.Lepší vyhořet
 9.Zátah na pedofily
 10.Veselé Velikonoce
 11.Na holou ne!
 12.Módní přehlídka
 13.Byl pozdní večer
 14.Rychlejší než světlo
 15.Milování v přírodě
 16.Akce čisté ruce
 17.Zásah v pravou chvíli
 18.Měsíc v úplňku
 19.Poslední opravdový chlap
 20.Nejkrásnější věk
 21.Narozeniny s vyhláškou

External links 
 On-line episodes on Voyo.cz (Official streams of TV Nova)
 

TV Nova (Czech TV channel) original programming
Czech comedy television series
1999 Czech television series debuts
1999 Czech television series endings